The Vocabulary of Interlinked Datasets (VoID) is an RDF vocabulary, and a set of instructions, that enables the discovery and usage of linked data sets. A linked dataset is a collection of data, published and maintained by a single provider, available as RDF on the Web, where at least some of the resources in the dataset are identified by dereferencable URIs. VoID is used to provide metadata on RDF datasets to facilitate query processing on a graph of interlinked datasets in the semantic web.

References

External links
 Describing Linked Datasets with the VoID Vocabulary

Metadata
Semantic Web
Knowledge representation
XML-based standards